Shang-Chi is a Marvel Comics character.

Shang-Chi may also refer to:
 Shang-Chi and the Legend of the Ten Rings, a 2021 superhero film based on the character
 Shang-Chi and the Legend of the Ten Rings (soundtrack)'', 2021 film soundtrack
 Shang-Chi (Marvel Cinematic Universe), the Marvel Cinematic Universe adaptation of the character